Hart Davis (1791–1854) was a British parliamentarian.

Davis matriculated at Christ Church, Oxford in 1809, and entered Lincoln's Inn in 1810. He was a Member of Parliament (MP) for Colchester from 1812 to 1818.

An interest in science led to him being elected in 1741 as a Fellow of the Royal Society.

References

1791 births
1854 deaths
Members of the Parliament of the United Kingdom for English constituencies
UK MPs 1812–1818
People educated at Eton College
Fellows of the Royal Society